United Brotherhood may refer to:

Religious organizations
 Unitas Fratrum, the Moravian Church

Labor organizations
 United Brotherhood of Carpenters and Joiners of England
 United Brotherhood of Carpenters and Joiners of America
 United Brotherhood of Railway Employees
 United Brotherhood of Teamsters
 United Brotherhood of Maintenance of Way Employees and Railway Shop Laborers
 United Brotherhood of Cement Workers
 United Brotherhood of Pulp and Sulphite Workers
 International United Brotherhood of Leather Workers on Horse Goods
 United Brotherhood of Welders, Cutters and Helpers of America

See also
 Railroad brotherhoods